The 1926 Giro d'Italia was the 14th edition of the Giro d'Italia, a Grand Tour organized and sponsored by the newspaper La Gazzetta dello Sport. The race was won by the Giovanni Brunero of the Legnano team. Second and third respectively were the Italian riders Alfredo Binda and Arturo Bresciani.

Participants

Of the 206 riders that began the Giro d'Italia on 15 May, 40 of them made it to the finish in Milan on 6 June. Riders were allowed to ride on their own or as a member of a team. There were six teams that competed in the race: Berrenttini, Ganna, Legnano, Météore, Olympia, and Wolsit. Eighteen of the 206 riders were on a team.

The peloton was primarily composed of Italians. The field featured two former Giro d'Italia champions in two-time winners Costante Girardengo and Giovanni Brunero, 1924 winner Giuseppe Enrici, and returning champion Alfredo Binda. Other notable Italian riders that started the race included Giovanni Rossignoli and Angelo Gremo.

Final standings

Stage results

General classification

There were 40 cyclists who had completed all twelve stages. For these cyclists, the times they had needed in each stage was added up for the general classification. The cyclist with the least accumulated time was the winner. Giuseppe Enrici won the prize for best ranked independent rider in the general classification.

Notes

References

Giro d'Italia by year
Giro Ditalia, 1926
Giro Ditalia, 1926
Giro d'Italia
Giro d'Italia